A ruff is an item of clothing worn in Western, Central, and Northern Europe and Spanish America from the mid-16th century to the mid-17th century. The round and flat variation is often called a millstone collar after its resemblance to millstones for grinding grain.

History
The ruff, which was worn by men, women and children, evolved from the small fabric ruffle at the neck of the shirt or chemise. Ruffs served as changeable pieces of cloth that could themselves be laundered separately while keeping the wearer's doublet or gown from becoming soiled at the neckline. The stiffness of the garment forced upright posture, and their impracticality led them to become a symbol of wealth and status.

Ruffs were primarily made from linen cambric, stiffened with starch imported from the Low Countries. Later ruffs were sometimes made entirely from lace, an expensive embellishment developed in the early sixteenth century. 

The size of the ruff increased as the century went on. "Ten yards is enough for the ruffs of the neck and hand" for a New Year's gift made by her ladies for Elizabeth I of England in 1565, but the adoption of starch allowed ruffs to be made wider without losing their shape. Later ruffs were separate garments that could be washed, starched, and set into elaborate figure-of-eight folds by the use of heated, cone-shaped goffering irons. At their most extreme, "cartwheel ruffs" were a foot or more wide; these cartwheel ruffs required a wire frame called a supportasse or underpropper to hold them at the fashionable angle.

By the start of the seventeenth century, ruffs were falling out of fashion in Western Europe, in favour of wing collars and falling bands. The fashion lingered longer in the Dutch Republic, where ruffs can be seen in portraits well into the seventeenth century, and farther east. The ruff remained part of the ceremonial dress of city councillors (Senatoren) in the cities of the Hanseatic league and of Lutheran clergy in Denmark, Norway, the Faroe Islands, Iceland, and Greenland.

The ruff was banned by Philip IV of Spain.

Today

Ruffs remain part of the formal attire of bishops and ministers in the Church of Denmark and the Church of the Faroe Islands and are generally worn for services. The Church of Norway removed the ruff from its clergy uniform in 1980, although some conservative ministers, such as Børre Knudsen, continued to wear them. Ruffs are optional for boy sopranos in Anglican church choirs.

Colours
The most popular and basic colour for ruffs was white, but sometimes the starch used to stiffen the ruff was enhanced with dyes, giving ruffs a range of pastel shades that washed away along with the starch. Dyes of vegetable origin made ruffs pink, light purple, yellow, or green. Light purple could also be achieved using cochineal. Yellow could come from saffron, and pale blue from smalt.

The bluish tint of a ruff was supposed to make the wearer's complexion appear paler, thus more attractive to contemporaries. Elizabeth I took against this colour and issued a royal prerogative: "Her Majesty's pleasure is that no blue starch shall be used or worn by any of her Majesty's subjects, since blue was the colour of the flag of Scotland ...". 

Of the dyed ruffs, those in yellow were the most popular throughout Europe. In England, yellow went out of fashion after the trial and execution of convicted murderer Anna Turner, who was considered the inventor of yellow starch. During her trial the yellow-dyed ruffs started to be seen as a symbol of declining morality. According to some of Anne's contemporaries, she wore a yellow ruff to her trial, after which the executioner ironically decided to wear the same colour to carry out her sentence. However, this may only be a  rumour of the time, as there are other primary sources that do not mention this detail.

Coloured ruffs are rarely seen in portraits not only because they were overall less popular than the white ones, but also because later restorers repainted them, believing white to be the  "correct" colour for ruffs.

Gallery

See also
1550–1600 in Western European fashion
1600–1650 in Western European fashion
Piccadill, a similar clothing fashion

References

Bibliography
Janet Arnold:  Queen Elizabeth's Wardrobe Unlock'd, W. S. Maney and Son Ltd., Leeds 1988.

External links

How To Starch a Ruff Part I of IV
Portraiture illustrating development from modest 1530s ruffs to the gigantic ruffs of the 1590s
17th century millstone ruff at the Rijksmuseum in Amsterdam

16th-century fashion
17th-century fashion
History of clothing (Western fashion)
Neckwear
Protestant vestments